The 2022–23 Liga 3 is second season of Portuguese football's third-tier league, following the reorganization which saw the Campeonato de Portugal moving one level down in the Portuguese football league system. Second season, a total of 24 teams compete in this division for the final time, and reduced to 20 teams for next season.

Format
This competition consists of a first stage with all the teams then proceed to a promotion or relegation series depending on their performance.

First Stage

In the first stage, the 24 clubs are divided in two series (Série A and B) of 12 teams, according to geographic criteria. In each series, teams play against each other in a home-and-away double round-robin system. The four best-placed teams of the two series will advance to the promotion series and bottom 8 teams will proceed to the relegation series.

Promotion Stage

The eight qualified teams are divided in two series of 4 teams, playing against each other in a home-and-away double round-robin system. The winners of each series will be automatically promoted to Liga Portugal 2 and will face each other in a neutral venue to determine the champion. The second best placed teams will face each other in a playoff, whose winner will face the 16th placed of Liga Portugal 2 for the last spot in Liga Portugal 2. On this stage teams will be divided as follows.

Relegation Stage

The bottom 8 teams are divided in four series of 4 teams, playing against each other in a home-and-away double round-robin system. To account for their performance in the first stage, teams will start with bonification points, with 5th placed teams starting with 8 points and 12th placed teams starting with 1. The two bottom teams of each series will be relegated to Campeonato de Portugal for this season.

Teams 
A total of 24 teams contested the league, including 2 teams relegated from the 2021–22 Liga Portugal 2, 17 teams that have been in 2021–22 Liga 3 (Portugal) and 5 teams promoted from the 2021–22 Campeonato de Portugal.

Cova da Piedade failed to produce valid licensing documentation to compete in the 2022–23 season of the Liga 3, so they had been relegated by the Portuguese Football Federation to District Championships. As a result, an additional team of (2021–22 Campeonato de Portugal) will be promoted to Liga 3 for the 2022–23 season.

Stadium and locations

First stage
In the first stage, the 24 clubs will be divided in two series (Série A and B) of 12 teams, according to geographic criteria.

Série A

Série B

Second stage
In the second stage, the 24 clubs were divided in 2 promotion series (Serie 1 and 2) of 4 teams and 4 relegation series (Serie 1, 2, 3 and 4) of 4 teams.

Promotion series

Serie 1

Serie 2

Relegation series

Serie 1

Serie 2

Serie 3

Serie 4

Number of teams by district

References 

Portugal
3
P